Vangin (also Romanized as Vangīn and Wangin) is a village in Niyarak Rural District, Tarom Sofla District, Qazvin County, Qazvin Province, Iran. At the 2006 census, its population was 64, in 18 families.

References 

Populated places in Qazvin County